Chloroclystis consocer is a moth in the family Geometridae. It is found on the Comoros and in Kenya, Malawi, South Africa and Tanzania.

The larvae feed on Vachellia xanthophloea.

References

External links

consocer
Moths of the Comoros
Moths described in 1937
Taxa named by Louis Beethoven Prout